Ināra is a Latvian  feminine given name. The associated name day is May 12.

Notable people named Ināra
Ināra Ābele-Cera, Latvian ballet dancer
Ināra Mūrniece (born 1970), Latvian journalist and politician
Ināra Rudko (born 1975), Latvian cross-country skier 
Ināra Tetereva (born 1953), Latvian patron of the arts and charity

References 

Latvian feminine given names
Feminine given names